Stipe Erceg (born 30 October 1974) is a German/Croatian actor. He is notable for playing the role of Peter in the 2004 Hans Weingartner film The Edukators alongside Daniel Brühl and Julia Jentsch, as well as the role of Holger Meins in The Baader Meinhof Complex.

Erceg was born in Split, SR Croatia, Yugoslavia. He moved from Croatia to Tübingen, Germany, with his parents in 1978 and studied acting at Europäisches Theaterinstitut Berlin from 1996 to 2000.

, Erceg lives with his wife and two children in Berlin, where he moved in 1996.

Awards
Stipe Erceg has won three awards throughout his career.

Filmography

 Kiki+Tiger (2003)
 Der Typ (2003)
 Yugotrip (2004)
 The Edukators (2004)
 Dont Look For Me (2004)
 Puca (2005)
  (2005)
 Crash Test Dummies (2005)
 Ich sehe was, was Du nicht siehst... (2005)
  (2005)
 The Ring Finger (2005)
  (2006)
  (2007)
 The Baader Meinhof Complex (2008)
 The Bone Man (2009)
  (2009)
 Johan Falk: Operation Näktergal (2009)
 The Albanian (2010)
 Unknown (2011)
 Hell (2011)
 Blaubeerblau (2011)
 The Fourth State (2012)
 Opération Libertad (2012)
 Schilf - Alles, was denkbar ist, existiert (2012)
 Vampire Sisters (2012)
 Robin Hood (2013)
  (2013)
 Seegrund. Ein Kluftingerkrimi (2013)
 Die Pilgerin (2014)
 Die Vampirschwestern 2 – Fledermäuse im Bauch (2014)
 Buddha's Little Finger (2015)
 Kommissar Marthaler – Ein allzu schönes Mädchen (2015)
 Kommissar Marthaler – Engel des Todes (2015)
  (2015)
  (2016)
 Home Is Here (2016)
 Allein gegen die Zeit – Der Film (2016)
 Das beste Stück vom Braten (2016)
 Die Vampirschwestern 3 – Reise nach Transsilvanien (2016)
 Letzte Spur Berlin (2017)
 Honigfrauen (2017)
 Culpa – Niemand ist ohne Schuld (2017)
 Trakehnerblut (2017)
 Vienna Blood – The Devil's Kiss (2021)

References

External links
 

1974 births
Actors from Split, Croatia
Living people
Croatian male film actors
German male film actors
Yugoslav emigrants to Germany